The Electrobat was one of the first electric automobiles. It was designed and built in 1894 by mechanical engineer Henry G. Morris and chemist Pedro G. Salom in Philadelphia, Pennsylvania.

History 
Both Morris and Salom had backgrounds in battery streetcars and, as the battery streetcar business was fading, they teamed up to make battery road vehicles. Their effort called the Electrobat was patented on August 31, 1894. Built like a small version of a battery streetcar, it was a slow, heavy, impractical vehicle with steel tires to support the 1,600 pound immense weight of its large lead battery. Improved as the Electrobat II, it entered production in 1895. In 1896, the pair founded the Morris & Salom Electric Carriage and Wagon Company.

Subsequent versions were lighter and had pneumatic tires, with bodies built at the Caffrey Carriage Company in Camden, New Jersey. Morris and Salom went on to build about a dozen Hansom cabs based on this vehicle, to compete with the horse-drawn cabs then in service in New York City; they operated in New York, Boston, and elsewhere. They sold the cabs and their concept to Isaac L. Rice, who reincorporated the enterprise as the Electric Vehicle Company (Elizabethport, New Jersey), in 1897, which later became part of Albert Augustus Pope's empire.

See also 

 1895 Electrobat IV at ConceptCarz

References

Vehicles introduced in 1894
1890s cars
Defunct motor vehicle manufacturers of the United States
Companies based in Philadelphia
Motor vehicle manufacturers based in Pennsylvania
Highwheeler
Electric vehicles introduced in the 19th century
Electric vehicle manufacturers
Veteran vehicles